Otilio Alberto Olguín Rodrigo (13 February 1931 – 28 November 1994) was a Mexican swimmer and water polo player who competed in the 1952 Summer Olympics.

References

1931 births
1994 deaths
Mexican male water polo players
Mexican male freestyle swimmers
Olympic water polo players of Mexico
Water polo players at the 1952 Summer Olympics
Swimmers at the 1955 Pan American Games
Pan American Games bronze medalists for Mexico
Pan American Games medalists in swimming
Competitors at the 1954 Central American and Caribbean Games
Central American and Caribbean Games gold medalists for Mexico
Central American and Caribbean Games medalists in swimming
Medalists at the 1955 Pan American Games
20th-century Mexican people